The Oregon Commission for Women established the Oregon Women of Achievement in 1985 to recognize the accomplishments of Oregon women and to demonstrate appreciation for their endeavors. Qualifying candidates to be nominated for the Oregon Women of Achievement are exemplary role models who promote the status of women in society, are committed to diversity and equity and have earned recognition for success and leadership in their fields. , 81 women have been honored by the Oregon Commission for Women.

Inductees

See also

 List of awards honoring women

References

Further reading

External links
Oregon Women of Achievement website

1985 establishments in Oregon
Awards established in 1985
Awards honoring women
Halls of fame in Oregon
Lists of American women
State halls of fame in the United States
Women in Oregon
Women's halls of fame